Saudia Flight 163 was a scheduled Saudia passenger flight departing from Quaid-E-Azam Airport in Karachi, Pakistan bound for Kandara Airport in Jeddah, Saudi Arabia via Riyadh International Airport in Riyadh, Saudi Arabia that caught fire after takeoff from Riyadh International Airport (now the Riyadh Air Base) en route to Jeddah, Saudi Arabia on 19 August 1980. Although the Lockheed L-1011-200 TriStar made a successful emergency landing at Riyadh, the flight crew failed to perform an emergency evacuation of the airplane, leading to the deaths of all 287 passengers and 14 crew on board the aircraft from smoke inhalation.

The accident is the deadliest involving a Lockheed L-1011 TriStar, as well as the deadliest aviation disaster to occur in Saudi Arabia. At the time, this was the second deadliest aircraft accident in the history of aviation involving a single airplane after Turkish Airlines Flight 981.

Aircraft and crew

Aircraft 
The aircraft involved in the accident was a Lockheed L-1011-200 TriStar (registered in Saudi Arabia as HZ-AHK). It made its first flight on 13 July 1979, and was delivered to Saudia on 21 August 1979.

Crew 
The captain of the flight was 38-year-old Mohammed Ali Khowyter, a Saudi who was hired by Saudia in 1965. He had flown numerous aircraft such as Douglas DC-3, DC-4, McDonnell Douglas DC-9, Boeing 707 and 737. Khowyter's records described him as a slow learner and needing more proper training. Khowyter had 7,674 flying hours, including 388 hours in the TriStar. The first officer was 26-year-old Sami Abdullah M. Hasanain, also a Saudi who joined the airline in 1977 and had previously worked as a trainee. He received his type rating on the TriStar eleven days before the accident. At one point during his training, however, due to his poor performance, Hasanain was removed from flying school. Hasanain had 1,615 flying hours, including 125 hours in the TriStar. The flight engineer was 42-year-old Bradley Curtis, an American who was hired by the airline in 1974. He had been qualified as a captain of the Douglas DC-3, and was then assigned to train in either the Boeing 707 or 737, but failed to qualify either as a captain or as a first officer because he did not meet the requirements. He had needed to pay for his own training as an L-1011 flight engineer in order to keep his job. Curtis had 650 flying hours, including 157 hours in the TriStar.

Accident

Flight 163 departed Qu'aid-e-Azam International Airport (now Jinnah International Airport) in Karachi, Pakistan at 18:32 Pakistan time (13:32 UTC) bound for Jeddah International Airport in Jeddah, Saudi Arabia, with a scheduled intermediate stop at Riyadh Airport. The flight arrived in Riyadh at 19:06 Saudi time (16:06 UTC). There was a two-hour layover for refueling. During the layover, several of the passengers disembarked. After refueling, the flight took off at 21:08 (18:08 UTC) bound for Jeddah.

Almost seven minutes into the flight, the crew received warnings of smoke from the cargo compartment. The crew spent the next four minutes trying to confirm the warnings, after which Flight Engineer Curtis went back into the cabin to confirm the presence of smoke. Captain Khowyter decided to return to the airport, and First Officer Hasanain radioed their intentions at 21:20 (18:20 UTC). At 21:25 (18:25 UTC), the thrust lever for the number two engine (the center engine) became jammed as the fire burned through the operating cable. Then, at 21:29 (18:29 UTC), the engine was shut down during final approach.

At 21:35 (18:35 UTC), Khowyter declared an emergency and landed back at Riyadh. After touchdown at 21:36 (18:36 UTC), the airplane continued to a taxiway at the end of the runway where it exited the runway, stopping two minutes and 40 seconds after touchdown at 21:39 (18:39 UTC). The airport fire rescue equipment was stationed back on the landing section of the runway, with emergency personnel expecting an emergency stop and evacuation. This meant they had to rush after the aircraft, which had used the entire length of a  runway to slow and then exit onto the taxiway. The airplane stopped facing in the opposite direction from landing.

Once the aircraft had stopped, the crew reported that they were shutting down the engines and about to evacuate. On arrival at the aircraft soon after, however, the rescue personnel found that the two wing-mounted engines were still running, preventing them from opening the doors. These were finally shut down at 21:42 (18:42 UTC), three minutes and 15 seconds after the aircraft came to a stop, at which point communication with the crew was lost. No external fire was visible at this time, but flames were observed through the windows at the rear of the aircraft. Twenty-three minutes after engine shutdown, at 22:05 (19:05 UTC), the R2 door (second door on the right side) was opened by ground personnel. Three minutes later, the interior of the aircraft flashed over, and was destroyed by fire.

Why Captain Khowyter failed to evacuate the aircraft promptly is not known. Saudi reports stated that the crew could not get the plug-type doors to open in time. It is assumed that most passengers and flight attendants were incapacitated during the landing roll, or they did not attempt to open a door on a moving aircraft. It is known that the aircraft remained pressurized during the landing roll as the cabin pressurization system was on standby, and the aircraft was found with both pressurization hatches almost completely closed. The pressurization hatches should have opened completely on touchdown to depressurize the aircraft. The crew were found still in their seats, and all the victims were found in the forward half of the fuselage. Autopsies were conducted on some of the non-Saudi nationals, including the American flight engineer. All of them perished from smoke inhalation and not burns, which indicated that they had died long before the R2 door was opened. The source of the fire in compartment C3 could not be determined.

Passengers 

Eighty-two of the passengers boarded in Karachi while the remaining 205 passengers boarded in Riyadh. The majority of the passengers were Saudis and Pakistani religious pilgrims on their way to Mecca for a traditional Ramadan holiday. In addition to the Saudis and Pakistanis, there were 32 religious pilgrims from Iran. There were also a small number of passengers from various countries, who were heading to Jeddah for diplomatic missions.

Investigation

The investigation revealed the fire had started in the aft C3 cargo compartment. The fire was intense enough to burn through the cabin floor, causing passengers seated in that area of the cabin to move forward prior to the landing. Saudi officials found two butane stoves in the burned-out remains of the airliner, and a used fire extinguisher near one of them. One early theory was that the fire began in the passenger cabin when a passenger used his own butane stove to heat water for tea. The investigation found no evidence to support this theory.

Policy changes
After the event, the airline revised its training and emergency procedures. Lockheed also removed the insulation from above the rear cargo area, and added glass laminate structural reinforcement. The National Transportation Safety Board recommended that aircraft use halomethane extinguishers instead of traditional hand-held fire extinguishers.

Crew resource management
Flight 163 encapsulated the further need for the advent of crew resource management. This is evident from the primary lapses in effective communication that prevented the crew from carrying out a final successful evacuation from the aircraft. These lapses are enabled in part by so-called power distances between juniors and superiors in workplace settings, relationships found in all societies but emphasized more in some than in others. "In high power distance cultures, juniors do not question superiors and leaders may be autocratic", leading to situations where a first officer finds it difficult to question decisions made by the captain, conditions that may have been present on Saudia Flight 163. This phenomenon has the capability of affecting flight safety globally, but as the work performed in the cockpit is markedly dependent upon the ability of one worker to crosscheck the work of another and vice versa, the danger is most apparent in individuals brought up in cultures that traditionally revere high-power distances between those in positions of power and their subordinates. In 1982, the British current-affairs program World in Action aired an episode entitled "The Mystery of Flight 163". This documented the accident, and was subsequently used to train pilots in the value of crew resource management.

See also

List of accidents and incidents involving commercial aircraft
 Varig Flight 820 a flight of the Brazilian airline Varig that departed from Galeão International Airport in Rio de Janeiro, Brazil, on July 11, 1973, for Orly Airport, in Paris, France. The plane, a Boeing 707, registration PP-VJZ, made an emergency landing on onion fields about four kilometers from Orly Airport, due to smoke in the cabin from a fire in a lavatory. The fire caused 123 deaths; there were only 11 survivors (ten crew members and one passenger).
 Air Canada Flight 797, a flight that had an on-board fire believed to be due to an electrical fault. The plane managed to land, but a flashover fire during evacuation killed 23 of 41 passengers.
British Airtours Flight 28M, a flight that had to abort a takeoff from Manchester due to an engine fire. Because of issues with the evacuation, only 82 of the 137 people survived the event.

References

Notes

External links

Final Accident Report (Archive) General Authority of Civil Aviation
ICAO Circular 178-AN/111 No. 5 Lockheed L-1011 Tristar, HZ-AHK, accident at Riyadh, Saudi Arabia, on 19 August 1980. Report dated 16 January 1982, released by Presidency of Civil Aviation, Saudi Arabia.
Cockpit voice recorder transcript

163
Airliner accidents and incidents caused by in-flight fires
Aviation accidents and incidents in 1980
Aviation accidents and incidents in Saudi Arabia
August 1980 events in Asia
1980 in Saudi Arabia
Accidents and incidents involving the Lockheed L-1011
Fires in Saudi Arabia
1980 disasters in Saudi Arabia